Superman: Birthright is a twelve-issue comic book limited series published by DC Comics in 2003 and 2004, written by Mark Waid and drawn by Leinil Francis Yu and Gerry Alanguilan.

Originally, this series was intended to be a non-canon version of Superman, showcasing his origin and updating him for the 21st century. Soon after, it was decided to adopt the series as canon, and thus it replaced John Byrne's The Man of Steel series as Superman's canonical origin story. This editorial position lasted until the 2005–2006 Infinite Crisis crossover event, and the release of the new origin story, Superman: Secret Origin, in 2009.

Plot
The story begins with a retelling of the destruction of planet Krypton. Jor-El laments the fact that his world accomplished "miracles no one will remember" while he is busy preparing infant Kal-El's voyage. Kal-El's shuttle pod fires into space moments before the planet's destruction. Jor-El and his wife Lara regret that they will never know if Kal-El survives the journey.

Time winds forward to present day West Africa, where an ethnic conflict between the fictional Ghuri and Turaaba clans is claiming lives. Clark Kent, a freelance reporter in his early twenties, arrives to interview Ghuri political leader and human rights activist, Kobe Asuru. Their talk is interrupted by an assassination attempt on Asuru. Thanks to the chaos and confusion of the firefight, Kent is able to save Kobe without anyone noticing his superhuman powers and the two quickly become friends. Asuru's sister Abena, however, is suspicious of Kent's motives and even accuses him of acting in a condescending "white savior" manner. The Asurus emphasize the Ghuri tradition of honoring ancestors through wearing symbolic clothing and working for human rights.

Later, Clark interviews the Turaaba politician Rep. Kebile who dislikes Kobe and oppresses Ghuri rights. While protecting Abena from a thrown bomb, Clark hears a commotion and flies back to the rally where Kobe has already been fatally stabbed. Enraged, Clark grabs the fleeing assassin, demanding to know who hired him. The terrified killer points at Kebile, who is besieged with questions and is later forced to resign. Abena becomes her party's leader after her brother's death and now knows Clark is a super-powerful being, but promises to remain silent.

Clark returns to Smallville, determined to learn more about his alien heritage. He and his mother Martha unearth his spaceship and use a data tablet that came with it to examine holographic records of Kryptonian history. Inspired by Kobe Asuru's stories of honoring tradition, Clark realizes the S insignia had great significance on Krypton and seemed to symbolize the Kryptonians' hope for a better tomorrow. He refuses to wear a mask while taking flight. Martha's solution is that only Clark's human half requires a disguise. She dresses him in professional, nerdy attire that stands apart from his usual look and gives him prescription glasses to wear. She promises they will refract light so no one will notice his startling blue eyes (which would otherwise give him away). Clark learns to slouch and act nervous and clumsy, to distance his civilian identity from tall, self-assertive Superman.

He travels to Metropolis, a city swarmed with robotic anti-terrorist helicopters, and applies for a position at the Daily Planet, where he sees the publisher, Mr. Galloway, berating Jimmy Olsen for fetching him the wrong yogurt. Lois Lane steps in to defend Jimmy from their superior and Clark is immediately smitten with her. He finally meets Perry White for a one-on-one interview, but it does not go well. Moments later, a miniature robo-chopper hovering outside goes berserk and opens fire on the Daily Planet building. When no one is looking, Clark ducks out to change into his costume and flies off to repel the helicopters. When he rips a radio transmitter off one of the wrecked units, he uses his powers to trace the signal to the incomplete skyscraper in the distance: LexCorp.

Clark bursts into Lex Luthor's office, just as Luthor is speaking to someone via radio. He tells Luthor he saw the signals and knows he sabotaged the Army choppers. Luthor explains that no one can convict him on such evidence and demands to know how he is able to fly. At that moment, LexCorp's armored security barges in, with Lois and Jimmy behind them. When Lois asks what Lex's connection is to Metropolis' new hero, Lex pretends to endorse the caped figure and even calls him a friend. The next day, the Daily Planet webpage dubs the hero "SUPERMAN". Luthor is ready with a cover story: a disgruntled Army employee was behind the attacks. LexCorp has stepped in to produce the robotic helicopters now that the Army's model has been recalled. But the LexCorp connection is an unprecedented black mark on Luthor's sterling reputation; Perry decides that Clark has earned his shot.

Lois and Clark visit Lexcorp, where Luthor greets them both, but pretends to have never met Clark. He asserts that he is first and foremost an astrobiologist, and describes many lucrative LexCorp inventions that were designed solely on his theories of possible space life. He then makes an official statement: Superman is not of this Earth. Clark reports Luthor's findings to Perry, who orders he write it up. Clark protests, knowing that the revelation that Superman is an alien will drive people away. Perry insists, saying Luthor is the leading authority on this matter, which is proof enough. When the article gets published, people start being fearful of Superman.

While sulking in an empty restaurant, Clark hears a commotion as a suspension bridge across town inexplicably blows up. Superman speeds off to reconnect the bridge cables, but another explosion rocks the bridge. In his office, Lex Luthor watches the disaster and triggers bombs along the support column, making it appear that Superman is the one tearing it down. As the finishing touch, a mechanical drone in the water aims kryptonite radiation at Superman, causing him to collapse.

Realizing he has made an enemy in Luthor, Clark looks back on his childhood, when a young Lex arrived in Smallville. Lex was a quiet genius, but his intelligence alienated him from everyone around him. His parents were unloving and ruthlessly trained him to become the next Einstein. Despite his contemptuous exterior, Lex warmed to Clark when he discovered they shared a common interest: astronomy. Nonetheless, Lex started spending increasing amounts of time locked in his makeshift laboratory next to the Luthor mansion. During one of these periods of seclusion, Clark visited Lex, who allowed Clark inside to unveil his new invention, a sub-space communicator. Lex hoped that with a piece of meteor rock (Kryptonite), he would finally be able to open a wormhole into visions from an alien civilization. Experiencing his first bout of Kryptonite poisoning, Clark started to feel sick. Lex misread Clark's expression and believed he had become afraid of him like everyone else. Dismissing him from the lab and commencing with his experiment, he managed to open a portal into events and times of the planet Krypton, but his generator overloaded and exploded, engulfing the house in flames. Lex, his hair burned off, staggered through the flames to uncover the piece of Kryptonite that was integral to his machine. He neglected his father, who was buried beneath rubble and burning alive. In the present day, Lex recreates his failed experiment in the bowels of the research and is greeted with a wealth of visions from Krypton's past.

The next day, the newspapers blare warnings of an upcoming alien invasion, showing photos of alien warships bearing Superman's insignia. Experts at the Daily Planet analyze the footage and confirm it to be un-doctored and legitimate. Soon afterward, Metropolis is besieged by similar spaceships, along with a giant mechanical spider. They begin killing indiscriminately. Troops empty out of the vehicles in Kryptonian garb, all bearing red capes and S-shields. Just as Superman is about to intervene, Luthor uses the spires of his skyscraper to project a citywide "web" of Kryptonite radiation from which Superman cannot hide. When the police start firing on the vulnerable Superman, he assumes his Clark guise and meets up with Lois, who comments on how sick he looks. Upon returning to the newsroom, which is in chaos, Perry yells at Clark for coming to the office without a story on this crisis. Stripped of his powers and faced with imminent dismissal, Clark leaves a notice of resignation on his desk. When Lois catches him leaving, she calls him a "spineless worm", stating that they have an obligation to the public and she stood up for him. Clark leaves and Lois becomes furious.

The "alien commander", a man dressed in armor, calls himself Van-Gar and declares war on Earth. Clark, his confidence restored by Lois' sermon, dons his costume and charges Van-Gar's troops before they can open fire on a crowd of innocents. Superman labels him and his men "actors", and Van-Gar beats downs the weakened hero, whispering to him they're "not in it for the money". They believe Luthor is right and that Superman will turn on those weaker than him. Meanwhile, Lois sneaks back into the LexCorp building, which Luthor ordered abandoned. While Luthor gives orders to his men over his tele-screen, she grabs his shard of the Kryptonite out of its energy core, disabling the entire machine. Most of the robots attacking Metropolis are revealed as holograms and vanish, along with the Kryptonite web over the city.

Back at LexCorp, Luthor grabs the Kryptonite from Lois' hands. When she tells him everyone will know about his hoax, Lex reveals that he placed a Kryptonite bomb inside the suit of every "Kryptonian" soldier. His men don't know about them, but they are primed to go off and take out Superman in the blast. Luthor then shoves Lois off the skyscraper balcony. Superman is still grappling with Van-Gar, whose armor suddenly starts glowing green. He soars up with Van-Gar in his grip, ripping the bomb off moments before it explodes. In the instant before Lois hits the ground, Superman rushes up and catches her.

Superman returns to LexCorp, where Luthor is feverishly trying to reconnect with the static images to Krypton, this time to establish direct contact. Luthor begins requesting to be sent weapons before the machine overloads, embedding several Kryptonite pellets in his face. Visions of Krypton's destruction swirl on the view screen; Kryptonians from many years in the past start seeing the sparring adversaries and  wonder if they are real. Jor-El and Lara appear seconds after they have launched baby Kal-El and say goodbye to one another. An awestruck Superman realizes that is his name: Kal-El. The fight continues until a bloodied Luthor lies defeated. Superman runs up and calls out something into the void; but the transmission is cut off too soon, making him think his parents did not get to hear him. In the aftermath, Luthor, now scarred from the Kryptonite shrapnel that sprayed in his face, is facing indictment. Clark Kent writes the article that ruins Luthor's reputation, although Luthor has already assembled his lawyers and will probably beat the charges. "Van-Gar" was actually the leader of a group of extremist survivalists. Clark thanks Lois from dissuading him from quitting, but she reveals that he only has a job because she intercepted Clark's resignation letter. Clark takes the opportunity to try to ask her out and is instantly rebuffed, as Lois seems more interested in Superman.

During the last moments of Krypton, Jor-El and Lara see a static image crackling. A figure, barely visible and wearing the S-shield on his chest, says, "Mother... Father... I made it!"  Realizing that their efforts were successful and their son Kal-El had survived to become a great hero, Jor-El and Lara kiss as the building collapses around them in Krypton's final moments.

Publication history
The project was given to Mark Waid with the request create an origin story for Superman set in the 21st century, a series that new readers can understand without any previous knowledge of the character's mythos. This was something Waid had wanted to do since seeing Superman: The Movie for the first time.

By comparison to other origin retellings, Waid wanted some differences. In an attempt to make his character more relatable, his Superman is not infallible, he has problems with his boss, his dry cleaning gets lost and he longs to connect and be accepted. Another difference was having Africa in the origin which, as Waid has it, helps establish Kal-El/Clark as a citizen of the world and demonstrates what kind of journalist he is. The West Africa section and the ethnic conflict described within it between the fictional Ghuri and Turaaba clans seems to be inspired by the real-life Hutu and Tutsi wars in Rwanda.

The Infinite Crisis storyline altered Superman's history so that Birthright and John Byrne's The Man of Steel mini-series were removed as his canonical origin. This was reinforced by then-monthly Superman writer Kurt Busiek's statement that the post-Infinite Crisis Superman's origin had yet to be established. The new origin was later revealed in the Superman: Secret Origin mini-series.

Changes in continuity

In this series, Clark has the power to see the "aura" that surrounds all living things and fades away at the moment of death, something not shown in the Man of Steel mini-series. Clark can literally "see" when a person or animal dies, an experience that he finds profoundly disturbing. Because of this, Clark refuses to take a life, making him a vegetarian. This was influenced by a passage in Elliot S. Maggin's novel Miracle Monday. This "Soul Vision" created controversy among some segments of fandom, and as of now, its status in continuity has yet to be explored. However, in other comics he informs both Lex Luthor (in Lex Luthor: Man of Steel) and Superboy that he can see their souls. 
The Superman: Birthright miniseries reinstated several Silver Age elements of Superman, one of which is Kandor. After the mini-series was completed, its place in canon was shown in Superman (vol. 2) #200. Superman was thrown out of time and saw both versions of his origin: the Man of Steel and Birthright limited series. Entering the universe of the Birthright limited series, he experienced temporary amnesia. Afterward, he discovered/remembered the new history:
The city had been shrunken and was kept in the Fortress of Solitude. 
When shrunken in Kandor, Superman again has no more powers in the Red Sun Krypton-like environment. 
The city is once again from Krypton (but populated by non-Kryptonian aliens as well as native Kryptonians). 
The citizens also recall Brainiac stealing their city from Krypton, and not the wizard Tolos. 
It was not explained how Tolos got a hold of the "bottle city" from Brainiac. It had been speculated and later confirmed by Geoff Johns that Brainiac encountered the wizard and he stole one of the bottle cities from Brainiac's collection.
Apparently, a hundred years have passed in the city (while the world outside has aged normally). Because of this, Superman (or the ideal of him) had grown to god-like status and is worshiped in Kandor. The city had been shrunken and was kept in the Fortress of Solitude. 
The planet Krypton, described in the Byrne Man of Steel series as being 50 light years from Earth, was now said to have been located in the Andromeda Galaxy.
Among alterations to Superman's power spectrum, Superman's enhanced vision was strengthened, capable of detecting x-rays (hence his ability to see through walls), as well as "seeing" the transmissions and detection radii of satellites, enabling him to fly between and around their fields of vision to travel incognito. He has been able to see radio waves as early as the 1980s, as he traced his enemy the Toyman's radio broadcast in Alan Moore's Superman: Whatever Happened to the Man of Tomorrow? two-part story. This is primarily a case of showing how Superman deals with today's ever advancing communications technology. 
As in the Silver Age comics, Superman uses his eidetic memory combined with his super-speed to learn and comprehend vast amounts of knowledge. 
Franklin Stern, a character from post-Crisis continuity, is no longer publisher of the Daily Planet. That position belongs to Mr. Galloway, a rotund, obnoxious man.
Lex Luthor is stated several times during the story to be a leading astrobiologist. In pre-Crisis continuity, Luthor was a brilliant scientist with no specialty, then later an industrialist in post-Crisis continuity. Birthright'''s version of Luthor is a combination of both versions of the character, and though his knowledge as a general scientist is apparently unmatched (he is referred to as the smartest man in the world), astrobiology is his particular forte.
Lex Luthor is shown to have spent some time in Smallville, Superman's hometown. He attended high school with Clark Kent for at least a few months, befriending him in the process. This is a departure from the previous continuity, where he was born and raised in Metropolis' notorious Suicide Slum neighborhood. Though the Birthright limited series is no longer canon, it is known that Clark met Lex at some point early on before he became Superman, having been referenced in the 52 maxiseries (which was co-written by Birthright author Mark Waid). Also, Luthor now admits to being from Smallville, while in Birthright, he refused to admit he had ever been to the town and had erased all evidence of his being there.

In other media
Film
 Elements of Superman: Birthright can be found in the film Man of Steel (2013). The scene in which Clark Kent discovers that the kryptonian "S" in his ship is a symbol for "hope" is inspired by Birthright''.

References

External links
Discussion of Birthright's implications for continuity (by Neal Bailey).

2003 comics debuts
2004 comics endings
Comics by Mark Waid
Fiction about intergalactic travel
 Superman titles